Fanny Deberghes (born 21 February 1994 in Agen) is a French swimmer. She competed for the French team in the women's 4 × 100 metre medley relay event at the 2016 Summer Olympics.

References

Sportspeople from Agen
1994 births
Living people
French female swimmers
Olympic swimmers of France
Swimmers at the 2016 Summer Olympics
Swimmers at the 2013 Mediterranean Games
Mediterranean Games competitors for France